Patton Oswalt: Tragedy Plus Comedy Equals Time is a 2014 stand-up comedy special written and performed by Patton Oswalt, and directed by Bobcat Goldthwait. The performance was recorded at Spreckels Theater in San Diego, California.

It was to be released on January 16, 2014 via the online movie streaming website Epix HD but was pushed back by the company for unknown reasons. However, it did premiere on Comedy Central on April 6 and became available for purchase on April 8 in both DVD and CD format.

Track listing
 "My Fitness Future" – 3:41
 "Florida" – 5:57
 "I Am a Great Dad" – 4:45
 "I Am an Awful Dad" – 5:04
 "Adorable Racism" – 5:14
 "Creative Depression" – 6:38
 "Money and Pussy" – 2:42
 "Sellout" – 10:52
 "New Clothes" – 5:41
 "My Prostitute" – 4:29
 "Germany" – 5:14
 "Epilogue: Orudis Blamphfortt" – 8:27

References

External links
Official Epix HD site
 

2010s American television specials
2014 in American television
Films directed by Bobcat Goldthwait